Lubów may refer to the following places in Poland:
Lubów, Lower Silesian Voivodeship (south-west Poland)
Lubów, Lubusz Voivodeship (west Poland)